Scopadus is a genus of beetles in the family Cerambycidae, containing the following species:

 Scopadus charynae Santos-Silva & Nascimento, 2019
 Scopadus ciliatus Pascoe, 1857
 Scopadus selkingi Heffern, Santos-Silva & Nascimento, 2021

References

Cyrtinini
Cerambycidae genera